The Watkins Glacier is a glacier situated on the southeastern flank of Mount Shasta, in the U.S. state of California.  It occupies a small cirque in the Clear Creek drainage.  It is the smallest officially-named glacier on Mount Shasta, and it was not accorded that status until 1976, following a decades-long campaign by local resident R. Harry Watkins, Jr., to bring recognition to the previously-ignored glacier.

In 2002, scientists made the first detailed survey of Mount Shasta's glaciers in 50 years. They found that seven of the glaciers (including the Watkins) have grown over the period 1951–2002, with the Hotlum and Wintun Glaciers nearly doubling, the Bolam Glacier increasing by half, and the Whitney and Konwakiton Glaciers growing by a third.

See also
List of glaciers

References

Glaciers of Siskiyou County, California
Glaciers of California
Glaciers of Mount Shasta